Liolaemus torresi, the dragon of Torres-Mura, is a species of lizard in the family Iguanidae.  It is from Chile.

References

torresi
Lizards of South America
Reptiles of Chile
Endemic fauna of Chile
Reptiles described in 2003